Chester-le-Street United Football Club is a football club based in Chester-le-Street, England. They are currently members of the Northern League Division Two and play at the Ford Quarry Hub, Sunderland West End F.C..

History
Formed in 2020, Chester-le-Street United entered the Wearside League Division One. In 2022, the club was admitted into the Northern League Division Two.

Ground
The club started the 2022-23 season at the Riverside, Chester-le-Street but moved to Sunderland West End F.C..

References

Chester-le-Street
Association football clubs established in 2020
2020 establishments in England
Football clubs in England
Football clubs in County Durham
Wearside Football League
Northern Football League